Heyford railway station serves the village of Lower Heyford and surrounding areas in Oxfordshire, England. It is on the Cherwell Valley Line and is ideally located for visiting the Oxford Canal and Heyford Wharf, which are both alongside. The station, and the ten trains each Monday to Saturday serving it, are operated by Great Western Railway.

It is  measured from  via .

Services
Trains are all operated by Great Western Railway, except for one late night weekday service at 0053 to Banbury, operated by Chiltern Railways.  Some peak trains run through to/from London Paddington at peak times, but otherwise services operate between Oxford and Banbury only and call roughly every two hours.

Sundays services operate in the summer months only, usually from the May timetable change until mid-September (3 trains per day each way).

References

Railway stations in Oxfordshire
DfT Category F2 stations
Former Great Western Railway stations
Railway stations in Great Britain opened in 1850
Railway stations served by Great Western Railway
Railway stations served by Chiltern Railways